Eugène Auguste Ernest Havet (April 11, 1813December 21, 1889), French scholar, was born in Paris. He was the father of Pierre Antoine Louis Havet and Julien Havet.

Educated at the Lycée Saint-Louis and the Ecole Normale, he was for many years before his death professor of Latin eloquence at the Collège de France.

His two capital works were a commentary on the works of Pascal, Pensées de Pascal, publiées dans le texte authentique, avec un commentaire suivi et une étude littéraire (1852; 2nd ed. 2 vols., 1881), and Le Christianisme et ses origines (4 vols., 1871–1884), the chief thesis of which was that Christianity owed more to Greek philosophy than to the writings of the Hebrew prophets.

References 

1813 births
1889 deaths
École Normale Supérieure alumni
Academic staff of the Collège de France